Aleksandr Aleksandrovich Yevinov (born 1 April 2000) is a Russian football player. He plays for Dynamo Bryansk.

Club career
He made his debut in the Russian Professional Football League for Chertanovo-2 Moscow on 3 August 2018 in a game against Tekstilshchik Ivanovo.

He made his Russian Football National League debut for Chertanovo Moscow on 3 March 2019 in a game against SKA-Khabarovsk.

References

External links
 
 

2000 births
Sportspeople from Pskov
Living people
Russian footballers
Association football defenders
Russia youth international footballers
FC Chertanovo Moscow players
PFC Krylia Sovetov Samara players
FC Dynamo Stavropol players
FC Tekstilshchik Ivanovo players
FC Dynamo Bryansk players
Russian First League players
Russian Second League players